The Red Flag 6-class ( Pulg'ŭn'gi-6) is a  two-section, permanently coupled electric locomotive built by the Kim Chong-t'ae Electric Locomotive Works and used by the Korean State Railway for heavy freight trains on mountainous lines.

Description

As the electrification of the Korean State Railway's network continued into the 1980s, the Red Flag 1 and Red Flag 2 class locomotives were the dominant type in service under the wires. However, with the electrification of steep mountain lines, it was realised that a more powerful locomotive was needed. Therefore, the Kim Chong-tae Electric Locomotive Works began design work on an articulated locomotive to operate freight trains on the difficult mountainous sections.

Using the Red Flag 2 class as a starting point, the Red Flag 6 (붉은기6, Pulg'ŭn'gi-6) class was developed. The result was a permanently coupled Bo'Bo'+Bo'Bo' articulated locomotive with eight capacitors, made up of two sections; these sections are single-cab versions of the Red Flag 2. The Red Flag 6 class is thus an articulated descendant of the Škoda Type 30E, which had formed the basis for the design of the Red Flag 1 and Red Flag 2 after North Korea bought a licence to build the type, including technology transfer, from Czechoslovakia. The first prototype was shown in 1981.

Numbered in the 6000 series, production of the new design began in 1986, and was put into service in 1987 to haul freight trains on the P'yŏngra Line. Trial runs with passenger trains were undertaken, but the type is now mainly used on east-west freight trains on the P'yŏngra Line. The first prototype received a cream over red paint scheme, but production units are painted in the standard light blue over dark green livery.

Named locomotives 
There are three known named Red Flag 6 locomotives:

 Bright future-type (광명호, Kwangmyong-ho) - one known locomotive, painted in cream over blue with a white stripe,
 Thousand-ri of liberation No.1 (광복의천리길1호, Kwangbokuicholligil1-ho) - one known locomotive,
Thousand-ri of liberation No.2 (광복의천리길2호, Kwangbokuicholligil2-ho) - one known locomotive, painted in light green over dark green.

References

Locomotives of North Korea
Kim Chong-tae Works locomotives
3000 V DC locomotives
Railway locomotives introduced in 1981
Bo′Bo′+Bo′Bo′ locomotives